Maxime René Waleff (30 November 1874 – 31 March 1961) was a French rower who as a  member of the French club Société Nautique de la Marne and his team won the silver medal in the coxed pair in the 1900 Summer Olympics.

References

External links

1874 births
1961 deaths
French male rowers
Olympic rowers of France
Rowers at the 1900 Summer Olympics
Olympic silver medalists for France
Olympic medalists in rowing
Medalists at the 1900 Summer Olympics
European Rowing Championships medalists
Sportspeople from Geneva
French people of Swiss descent